Schöneck Castle may refer to:

 Schöneck Castle (Alsace), near Dambach in the Alsace, France
 Schöneck Castle (South Tyrol) also called Schloss Schöneck , near Kiens in the Pustertal valley, South Tyrol, Italy
 Schöneck Castle (Münstermaifeld), borough of Münstermaifeld, Rhineland-Palatinate, Germany
 Schöneck Castle (Vogtland), in the borough of Schöneck/Vogtl., Vogtlandkreis, Saxony, Germany
 Schloss Schöneck, municipality of Herschwiesen, Rhein-Hunsrück-Kreis, Germany

See also 
 Schöneck (disambiguation)